Skara Brae were an Irish traditional music group from Kells, County Meath with origins in Ranafast (Rann na Feirste), County Donegal. The group consisted of three siblings, Mícheál Ó Domhnaill, Tríona Ní Dhomhnaill, and Maighread Ní Dhomhnaill, with Dáithí Sproule from Derry. Their debut and only album Skara Brae is considered a seminal album in the Irish music tradition.

Origin 
Though brought up in County Meath, the Ó Domhnaill siblings had their roots in Ranafast (Rann na Feirste), where their father's family originated. Mícheál, Maighread, and Tríona came together with Dáithí during Irish language summer schools held in Rannafast during the late 1960s and subsequently formed the band Skara Brae while Triona and Maighread were still attending school. Mícheál and Dáithí were attending University College Dublin and performed in the city over the next year.

History

Unique album 
In 1971, Skara Brae released Skara Brae, a self-titled album of "beautifully performed Gaelic songs" on Gael-Linn Records. It is considered one of the most important albums in its genre, notable as the first recording to include vocal harmonization in Irish language songs.

Post-breakup 
The group disbanded in 1972. Dáithi Sproule went on to perform with numerous musicians before joining Irish supergroup Altan in 1992. Mícheál Ó Domhnaill and Tríona Ní Dhomhnaill later co-founded the highly influential Bothy Band in 1974, with flute player Matt Molloy, a succession of renowned fiddlers Paddy Glackin, Tommy Peoples, and Kevin Burke, piper Paddy Keenan, and Dónal Lunny.

Reunions 
Skara Brae reunited for two concerts for the Scoil Gheimhridh Frankie Kennedy in Gaoth Dobhair, Co. Donegal: the first one on 27 December 1997 (at Ionad Cois Locha in Dunlewey, Co. Donegal) and the second one in 2005.

On 12 September 2013, Dáithí Sproule announced the first Skara Brae (5-date) US tour to last from 25 to 30 October 2013 and to visit 5 US cities (Milwaukee, WI on 25; Madison, WI on 26; Saint Paul, MN on 27; Portland, OR on 29; Seattle, WA on 30). The newly reunited band will include Maighread Ní Dhomhnaill, Tríona Ní Dhomhnaill and Dáithí Sproule himself.

Discography 

 Skara Brae (1971)

See also 
 Skara Brae, an archeology site featuring the most complete neolithic village in Europe

References 

Irish folk musical groups
Musical groups established in 1970
Musical groups disestablished in 1971
1970 establishments in Ireland
1971 disestablishments in Ireland
Musical groups from County Meath